Elliptio producta, also known as the Atlantic spike, is a species of freshwater mussel, an aquatic bivalve mollusk in the family Unionidae, the river mussels. This species is endemic to the Eastern United States. It occurs on the Atlantic coast between the Savannah River and the Roanoke River basin. It may have been extirpated from the Ogeechee River system in Georgia. It lives in medium to large rivers on sand and gravel substrate.

References

producta
Freshwater animals of North America
Molluscs of the United States
Endemic fauna of the Southeastern United States
Bivalves described in 1836
Taxa named by Timothy Abbott Conrad
Taxonomy articles created by Polbot